Giles Edward Dixon Oldroyd  is a professor at the University of Cambridge, working on beneficial Legume symbioses in Medicago truncatula. He has been a Royal Society Wolfson Research Merit Award winner and the Society of Biology (SEB) President's Medal winner.  From 2014 Giles has been in the top 1% of highly cited plant scientists across the world.

Education
Giles attended Huntington School, York before studying for his Honours degree in Biology at the University of East Anglia from 1990 to 1994. He completed his PhD in 1998 at the University of California, Berkeley, studying plant/pathogen interactions in tomatoes.

Career and research
After his PhD, he moved to Stanford University to work as a postdoctoral scientist studying legume/rhizobial interactions in the laboratory of Sharon R. Long. In 2002, Giles moved to the John Innes Centre to start his own research group and in 2017 he moved his research group to the Sainsbury Laboratory, University of Cambridge. In 2020 Giles was appointed to the Russel R Geiger Professorship of Crop Science in the Department of Plant Sciences, University of Cambridge and Director of the new Crop Science Centre, a partnership between the University of Cambridge and the National Institute of Agricultural Botany.

Giles Oldroyd's work focuses on understanding the signalling mechanisms that allow the associations with these beneficial micro-organisms and the use of this information to transfer the nitrogen-fixing capability from legumes to cereal crops. 
His website says "Our work has implications for global agriculture, but we are most interested in the application of our work to benefit small-holder farmers in Sub-Saharan Africa".

In 2012 Giles Oldroyd was awarded a $10m grant from the Bill & Melinda Gates Foundation to begin the Engineering Nitrogen Symbiosis for Africa (ENSA) Project in collaboration with other symbiosis research groups. The aim of the research is to engineer cereal crops such as Maize to undergo the beneficial Root Nodule symbiosis in order to obtain the nutrient Nitrogen without the application of agricultural fertilisers.

He has an h-index of 72 according to Google Scholar.

Awards and honours
BBSRC David Phillips Fellow 2002-2007
Royal Society Wolfson Research Merit Award 2002-2005
European Molecular Biology Organization Young Investigator Award 2005-2008
Presidents Medal, Society for Experimental Biology (SEB), 2006
European Research Council young investigator 2009–Present
Thomson Reuters Top 1% Highly cited researcher 2014
Elected a Fellow of the Royal Society (FRS) 2020

References

Year of birth missing (living people)
Living people
Alumni of the University of East Anglia
University of California, Berkeley alumni
Fellows of Fitzwilliam College, Cambridge
21st-century British biologists
British LGBT scientists
Fellows of the Royal Society
Foreign associates of the National Academy of Sciences